Jean-François Regnard (7 February 1655 – 4 September 1709), "the most distinguished, after Molière, of the comic poets of the seventeenth century", was a dramatist, born in Paris, who is equally famous now for the travel diary he kept of a voyage in 1681.

Regnard inherited a fortune from his father, a successful merchant who had given him an excellent classical education; he then increased it, he affirms, by gambling. He took to traveling, and on a return voyage from Italy in 1678 was at the age of twenty-two captured by an Algerian pirate, sold as a slave in Algiers and taken to Constantinople, where the French consul paid ransom for his release. He went on traveling, undaunted. His Voyage de Flandre et de Hollande, commencé le 26 avril 1681. reporting his trip through the Low Countries, Denmark and Sweden, where he dallied at the courts of Christian V and Charles XI and then north to Lapland, returning through Poland, Hungary and Germany to France, is mined by social historians. The section often published on its own, his Voyage de Laponie, largely inspired by Johannes Schefferus, describes the way of life of the Sami of Lapland; it was not published until 1731, when its description of the backwardness and simplicity of the Sami people, their curious pagan customs, alcohol addiction and untidy lifestyle, introduced these strangers to cultured Europe.

After his return to Paris he purchased a sinecure in the Treasury that required no attention, and wrote farces and skits for the Théâtre des italiens, 1688–96. After inheriting his mother's considerable fortune in 1693, he devoted the time divided between his hôtel in Paris and his country house, the château of Grillon, near Dourdan, to writing comedies in verse for the Comédie française, twenty-three in total, the best of them being Le Joueur ("The Gamester", 1696), Le Distrait (1697), Les Ménechmes (1705), and his masterwork, Le Légataire universel ("The residuary legatee" [1706]), following closely in the steps of Molière. He was admired by Boileau.

He died at his château of Grillon in 1709.

References

External links
 
  
 Bibliomonde: Jean-François Regnard
 

1655 births
1709 deaths
Writers from Paris
17th-century French poets
18th-century French poets
17th-century French male writers
18th-century French male writers
17th-century French dramatists and playwrights
18th-century French dramatists and playwrights